The Fifth Season is a 2012 Belgian drama film directed by Peter Brosens and Jessica Woodworth. The film was selected to compete for the Golden Lion at the 69th Venice International Film Festival. The film received four nominations at the 4th Magritte Awards.

Cast
 Sam Louwyck as Pol
 Aurélia Poirier
 Django Schrevens
 Gill Vancompernolle

References

External links
 

2012 films
2012 drama films
Belgian drama films
2010s French-language films